Potamonautes platycentron is a species of freshwater crab in the family Potamonautidae, which is endemic to Lake Chala in Kenya and Tanzania. It was originally described by Franz Martin Hilgendorf in 1897, as Telphusa platycentron.

References

Potamoidea
Freshwater crustaceans of Africa
Arthropods of Kenya
Arthropods of Tanzania
Taxa named by Franz Martin Hilgendorf
Crustaceans described in 1897
Taxonomy articles created by Polbot